The Mbo language (or Imbo, Kimbo) is spoken by the Mbo people in the Democratic Republic of the Congo. In 1994 there were about 11,000 speakers. It is lexically similar to the Ndaka and Budu, Vanuma and Nyali languages.

References

Nyali languages
Languages of the Democratic Republic of the Congo